The 2021–22 season is Budapest Honvéd FC's 111st competitive season, 17th consecutive season in the OTP Bank Liga and 112nd year in existence as a football club.

Squad

Transfers

Summer

In:

Out:

Source:

Winter

In:

Out:

Source:

Competitions

Overview

Nemzeti Bajnokság I

League table

Results summary

Results by round

Matches

Hungarian Cup

Appearances and goals 
Last updated on 15 May 2022.

|-
|colspan="14"|Youth players:

|-
|colspan="14"|Out to loan:

|-
|colspan="14"|Players no longer at the club:

|}

Top scorers
Includes all competitive matches. The list is sorted by shirt number when total goals are equal.
Last updated on 15 May 2022

Disciplinary record
Includes all competitive matches. Players with 1 card or more included only.

Last updated on 15 May 2022

Clean sheets
Last updated on 15 May 2022

References

External links
 Official website
 UEFA
 Fixtures and results

Budapest Honvéd FC seasons
Hungarian football clubs 2021–22 season